Dillon River is a stream in Alberta and Saskatchewan, Canada. It discharges into Peter Pond Lake.

J. N. Wallace, a government surveyor, named Dillon River after a family member.

See also
Dillon River Wildland Park
List of rivers of Alberta
list of rivers of Saskatchewan
Hudson Bay drainage basin

References

Rivers of Alberta
Rivers of Saskatchewan